Juan Karlos (commonly stylized in all lowercase) is a Filipino rock band from Manila, Philippines, consisting of lead vocalist, rhythm guitarist and primary songwriter Juan Karlos Labajo, lead guitarist Jeriko Aguilar, bassist Louise Bayas and drummer Gian Hipolito. The band, currently signed under MCA Music and Island Records, first gained exposure with the release of their second single "Buwan".

History
In 2018, Juan Karlos Labajo revealed that he is forming a band named after him.

In August 2020, Labajo confirmed the band’s hiatus.

In July 2021, the band returned with the song Boston.

Discography

Albums
 2020: Diwa

Extended plays
 2022: Drop 1

Singles
 2018: "Demonyo (Redefined)"
 2018: "Buwan"
 2018: "Sistema"
 2019: "Biyak"
 2019: "Kalawakan"
 2020: "Sampaguita" with Gloc 9
 2021: "Boston"
 2022: "Kunwari"

Band members
Current members
 Juan Karlos Labajo – lead vocals, rhythm guitar (2017–present)
 Louise Bayas – bass, backing vocals (2018, present)
 Jeriko Aguilar - lead guitar (2020–present)
 Gian Hipolito - Drums (2017-present)

Past members
 Abe Hipolito – lead guitar, backing vocals (2017–2018)
 Juan Carlo Hipolito - lead guitars (2019)
 Clark Cunanan – bass, backing vocals (2018-2020)
 Marcus Ambat – lead guitar, backing vocals (2018–2019)
 Nim Laquian - lead guitar (2019)

References

Filipino rock music groups
Musical groups established in 2017
Musical groups from Metro Manila
Island Records artists